H-Hour (redundant acronym of hour) was the name given to the airborne assault during the Normandy landings of World War II. H-Hour occurred at 6:30 AM local time on June 6, 1944. The units involved included the U.S. 101st Airborne Division and U.S. 82nd Airborne Division, along with the British 6th Airborne Division. This took place about three hours before the main beach landings on the Normandy coast. The airborne invasion consisted of over 20,000 men and around 1,200 planes and gliders. The combined assault of the three Allied airborne divisions would surprise the German defenders and cause enough havoc behind the German lines, enabling the beach landings to go more smoothly.

Objectives of H-Hour
The divisions of paratroopers that landed each had an objective:
 The U.S. 82nd Airborne Division would drop and take the town of Sainte-Mère-Église and protect the right flank on the American beach landings of Omaha Beach and Utah Beach. After doing that, they would link up with the 101st.
 The U.S. 101st Airborne Division would be dropped behind Utah Beach, to secure the beach exits and be prepared to exploit through the town of Carentan.
 The British 6th Airborne Division would be dropped between the river Orne and some high ground of the Bois de Bavent to secure the eastern flank of the British and Canadian sector, landing at Sword Beach and Juno Beach, respectively.

Dropping the troops
When the airborne divisions were dropped, there were many mis-drops. Some were dropped as far as 20 miles away from their designated DZ (drop zone). Some were even dropped in the English Channel.  Often, the C-47's and modified B-23's that were used in the drops came under heavy fire and were forced to drop their Airborne members prematurely.  Pilots were often heavily criticized for this.  Another reason why many mis-drops occurred is that the transport aircraft's formations ("flying V's") flew through low lying clouds while crossing the English Channel.  The lack of visibility often caused pilots to drift away from the lead plane to avoid a crash.  This caused many pilots to have their bearings off and flying just a few degrees off course, which added up when this was done for several miles.

References

Operation Overlord